Bletia reflexa is a species of orchid native to Guatemala, Honduras, Chiapas, Oaxaca and Panama.

References

External links 

reflexa
Orchids of Guatemala
Orchids of Honduras
Orchids of Mexico
Orchids of Panama